Bobby Austin may refer to:

Bobby Austin (musician) (born 1933), American country musician.
Bobby William Austin (born 1944), American sociologist, lecturer, and writer

See also
Robert Austin (disambiguation)
Rob Austin (born 1981), English racing driver